The Next Generation Air Dominance (NGAD) is a United States Air Force (USAF) sixth-generation air superiority initiative with a goal of fielding a "family of systems" that is to succeed the Lockheed Martin F-22 Raptor. A manned fighter aircraft is the centerpiece program of NGAD and has been referred to as the F-X or Penetrating Counter-Air (PCA) and is to be supported by uncrewed Collaborative Combat Aircraft (CCA), or "Loyal Wingman" platforms, through manned-unmanned teaming (MUM-T).

The NGAD originates from DARPA's Air Dominance Initiative study in 2014, and is expected to field the new fighter aircraft in the 2030s. While having an identical name and sharing some technology developments, the program is distinct from the U.S. Navy's NGAD program, which has the F/A-XX as its fighter component and would have a similar fielding timeframe.

History
The NGAD was initiated in 2014 to develop a 2030s air superiority system for the U.S. Air Force. DARPA had completed its Air Dominance Initiative study in March 2014 and in 2015 launched the Aerospace Innovation Initiative to develop X-plane prototypes to demonstrate technology for future aircraft. In 2016, the USAF followed up DARPA's study with the Air Superiority 2030 (AS 2030) flight plan, but while the plan stated the need for a family of systems, it was still focused on a specific member of the family called the F-X or Penetrating Counter-Air (PCA). In 2018, AS 2030 evolved into the NGAD and expanded its focus from a single addition towards a suite of capabilities.

The NGAD aims to develop several key technologies in areas such as propulsion, stealth, advanced weapons, digital design (CAD-based engineering), and thermal management of the aircraft signature. The program changes traditional Air Force acquisition by the separation of design, production, and support functions in the development process with a $9 billion budget through 2025. More frequent industry competitions and simulations in the design and manufacturing process are characteristic of the development program. NGAD is described as a "family of systems", with a fighter aircraft as the centerpiece of the system, and other parts of the system likely to be uncrewed escort aircraft to carry extra munitions and perform other missions. In particular, NGAD aims to develop a system that addresses the operation needs of the Pacific theater of operations, where current USAF fighters lack sufficient range and payload. USAF commanders have noted that there may be two variants of NGAD: one with long range and payload for the Indo-Pacific and one more oriented to the relatively short ranges between possible battle areas in Europe. The fighter is expected to leverage adaptive cycle engines being developed under the Adaptive Engine Transition Program (AETP) and Next Generation Adaptive Propulsion (NGAP) program, with flight ready engines expected by 2025.

The crewed fighter component of the NGAD was briefly envisioned to follow the rapid development and procurement cycles of the "Century Series" fighter aircraft of the 1950s and 1960s; dubbed "Digital Century Series" by Assistant Secretary of the Air Force (SAF/AQ) Will Roper, fighter designs would be continually iterated to enable the rapid insertion of new technology and procured in small batches. In September 2020, Roper stated that a full-scale prototype of the NGAD fighter aircraft has been flown. In May 2021, chief of staff of the USAF General Brown stated that the NGAD will start replacing the F-22 once it is operational in sufficient quantity, with the fielding goal in the 2030s. The F-22 has also been used to test NGAD technology and some advances are expected to be applied to the F-22 as well. Due to the complexity and sophistication of modern aircraft design, however, the "Digital Century Series" concept was eventually abandoned in lieu of a more traditional development and procurement approach. In June 2022, the program has moved into the Engineering and Manufacturing Development (EMD) phase.

Developments
The cost of each plane was not disclosed by Air Force Secretary Frank Kendall, but is expected to be in the hundreds of millions. "It's going to be an expensive airplane" said Frank Kendall. In 2023, the Air Force's force structure planning projects approximately 200 manned NGAD fighters, although this is a notional figure for rough planning assumptions.

SMG Consulting shared an infographic on the program, showing dimensions, cost, and combat radius, based on the Lockheed Martin 6th generation fighter artist impressions.

See also
 Global Combat Air Programme
 Mikoyan PAK DP
 Future Combat Air System
 BAE Systems Tempest

References

Military aircraft procurement programs of the United States
Proposed military aircraft of the United States
Stealth aircraft
Twinjets